The women's foil was one of seven fencing events on the fencing at the 1948 Summer Olympics programme. It was the fifth appearance of the event. The competition was held from 31 July 1948 to 2 August 1948. 39 fencers from 15 nations competed.

The competition format was pool play round-robin, with bouts to four touches. Not all bouts were played in some pools if not necessary to determine advancement. Ties were broken through fence-off bouts ("barrages") in early rounds if necessary for determining advancement, but by touches received in final rounds (and for non-advancement-necessary placing in earlier rounds).

Results

Round 1

The top 4 finishers in each pool advanced to round 2.

Pool 1

Pool 2

Pool 3

Minton defeated Martin and Fullone in a three-way barrage for fourth place.

Pool 4

Pool 5

Pool 6

Dow defeated Rieder in a barrage for fourth place.

Round 2

The top 3 finishers in each pool advanced to the semifinals.

Pool 1

Pool 2

Elek-Schacherer and Wenisch-Filz defeated Garilhe in a three-way barrage for second and third place.

Pool 3

Minton defeated Martin and Fullone in a three-way barrage for fourth place.

Pool 4

Cesari defeated York-Romary in a barrage for third place.

Semifinals

The top 4 finishers in each pool advanced to the final.

Semifinal 1

Wenisch-Filz defeated Camber-Corno in a barrage for fourth place.

Semifinal 2

Elek-Schacherer and Wenisch-Filz defeated Garilhe in a three-way barrage for second and third place.

Final

The final resulted in two different three-way ties in the standings: second, third, and fourth place at 5–2 and sixth, seventh, and eighth place at 1–6. Elek-Schacherer took gold with a 6–1 final record, losing only to fifth-place finished Wenisch-Filz. Lachmann took silver, with only 11 touches received compared to 16 each for Müller-Preis and Cerra. Müller-Preis then took bronze, on the strength of one more touch scored (24 to Cerra's 23). The other tie was broken similarly; Elek finished sixth with 26 touches received to Cesari and Glen-Haig's 27 apiece, while Cesari prevailed over Glen-Haig due to her 15 touches scored to the latter's 10.

References

Foil women
Olymp
Fen